Intex-Press (Интекс-пресс, 17,300 copies) is an independent local newspaper published in Baranovichi, Belarus.

Running out of print  
On April 15, 2021, the editor-in-chief of the newspaper Vladimir Yanukevich was summoned by the interdistrict prosecutor Alexander Karlyuk and issued a warning of the Baranavichy interdistrict prosecutor's office for an interview with Sviatlana Tsikhanouskaya. On April 26, the court of the Baranovichy District district and the city of Baranavichy (judge Nikolay Kmita) fined Yanukevich 20 basic units, as he was accused of violating the law on mass media in the form of disseminating information on the Internet, the dissemination of which is prohibited. On May 4, 2021, the Ministry of Information issued a warning to the editorial office for the interview. On May 5, 2021, the Brest Regional Economic Court (judge Igor Kondratyuk) punished Yanukevich with a fine of 150 base units for the printed version of the interview. 

On April 28, 2021, it became known that Belposhta would not include the publication in the subscription catalog for the second half of the year and would not take it for sale in offices. Private retail chains, such as Belmarket, Marcin, Dobronom and others, also refused to sell the newspaper. On May 4, 2021, Belsayuzdruk (the government-run newspaper stand chain) unilaterally refused to sell the newspaper from May 5, 2021, a letter about this was signed by the director of the Brest branch of the state monopoly Tatyana Zinevich. On May 9, 2021, the Belarusian Press House unilaterally refused to print the newspaper, a letter to this effect was signed by Deputy General Director for Production and Ideological Work Yuri Arikhovsky.

Andrey Bastunets, chairman of the Belarusian Association of Journalists, noted that the persecution of Intex-press in all directions was coordinated by someone. OSCE Representative on Freedom of the Media Teresa Ribeiro condemned the pressure on Intex-press to interfere with the work of the media under the pretext of fighting extremism.

References

Bilingual newspapers
Russian-language newspapers published in Belarus
Mass media in Baranavichy
Free Media Awards winners
Censorship in Belarus